Cryopterygius (meaning 'frozen fin' in Greek) is an extinct genus of ophthalmosaurid ichthyosaur known from the uppermost Jurassic of Central Spitsbergen, Norway. The type species, Cryopterygius kristiansenae , is known from a single, but largely complete specimen from the Slottsmøya Member of the Agardhfjellet Formation (middle Volgian/late Tithonian, Late Jurassic). A second species, C. kielanae, was found in the Kcynia Formation from the Late Jurassic of Poland.

See also 
 List of ichthyosaurs
 Timeline of ichthyosaur research

References

External links 

Ophthalmosaurinae
Late Jurassic ichthyosaurs
Ichthyosaurs of Europe
Jurassic Norway
Fossils of Svalbard
Agardhfjellet Formation
Fossil taxa described in 2012
Ichthyosauromorph genera